Positive obligations in human rights law denote a State's obligation to engage in an activity to secure the effective enjoyment of a fundamental right, as opposed to the classical negative obligation to merely abstain from human rights violations.

Classical human rights, such as the right to life or freedom of expression, are formulated or understood as prohibitions for the State to act in a way that would violate these rights. Thus, they would imply an obligation for the State not to kill, or an obligation for the State not to impose press censorship. Modern or social rights, on the other hand, imply an obligation for the State to become active, such as to secure individuals' rights to education or employment by building schools and maintaining a healthy economy. Such social rights are generally more difficult to enforce.

Positive obligations transpose the concept of State obligations to become active into the field of classical human rights. Thus, in order to secure an individual's right to family life, the State may not only be obliged to refrain from interference therein, but positively to facilitate for example family reunions or parents' access to their children.

The most prominent field of application of positive obligations is Article 8 of the European Convention on Human Rights.

Important cases have been taken to the ECHR in Strasbourg which over the last ten years has moved to making positive obligations especially in the field of transsexuals right to decide if they want surgery to convert their bodies as far as possible from one sex to the other.
Cases such as Van Kuck v Germany 2003 made it positive obligation on EU states to provide sex change surgery and this was repeated in the L v Lithuania 2007 verdict and again in the Schlump v Switzerland 2009 verdict.  Because of this the Swiss Government and many other removed the need for a person to prove they needed sex change surgery in 2010.
However, there are still countries, especially the UK, which refuse to accept the legality of the positive obligations on them regardless of the fact that this makes them liable to being found guilty of Article 8 violations.
See ECHR Van Kuck v Germany 2003.
See ECHR L V Lithuania 2007.
See ECHR Schlumpf v Switzerland 2009.

In 2021, the ECHR ruled in Fedotova and Others v. Russia that there was a positive obligation to recognize same-sex partnerships based on article 8.

References

 
 

Human rights legislation
Law of obligations
International law